The Daikin Orchid Ladies Golf Tournament is an annual event on the LPGA of Japan Tour. It was first held in March 1988 at the Ryukyu GC in Okinawa Prefecture. The prize money in 2021 was ¥120,000,000 with ¥21,600,000 going to the winner.

Winners 
2023  [Jiyai Shin]]
2022  Mao Saigo
2021  Sakura Koiwai
2020 Cancelled
2019  Mamiko Higa
2018  Lee Min-young
2017  Ahn Sun-ju
2016  Teresa Lu
2015  Teresa Lu
2014  Onnarin Sattayabanphot
2013  Rikako Morita
2012  Airi Saitoh
2011  Inbee Park
2010  Ahn Sun-ju
2009  Yuko Mitsuka
2008  Song Bo-bae
2007  Midori Yoneyama
2006  Mikiyo Nishizuka
2005  Orie Fujino
2004  Ai Miyazato
2003  Yuri Fudoh
2002  Kasumi Fujii
2001  Yuri Fudoh
2000  Orie Fujino
1999  Yoko Inoue
1998  Kim Ae-sook
1997  Woo-Soon Ko
1996  Li Wen-lin
1995  Marnie McGuire
1994  Akiko Fukushima
1993  Fuki Kido
1992  Patty Sheehan
1991  Amy Benz
1990  Aiko Takasu
1989  Patti Rizzo
1988  Huang Bie-shyun

External links
 

LPGA of Japan Tour events
Golf tournaments in Japan
Sports competitions in Okinawa Prefecture
Recurring sporting events established in 1988
1988 establishments in Japan
Daikin